Norbert Meisner (born November 7, 1942) is a German politician (SPD). He was a Finance senator for Berlin.

References 

1942 births
Senators of Berlin
Living people